αE-catenin, also known as Catenin alpha-1 is a protein that in humans is encoded by the CTNNA1 gene. αE-catenin is highly expressed in cardiac muscle and localizes to adherens junctions at intercalated disc structures where it functions to mediate the anchorage of actin filaments to the sarcolemma. αE-catenin also plays a role in tumor metastasis and skin cell function.

Structure
Human αE-catenin protein is 100.0 kDa and 906 amino acids. Catenins (α,β,and γ (also known as plakoglobin)) were originally identified in complex with E-cadherin, an epithelial cell adhesion protein. αE-catenin is highly expressed in cardiac muscle and is homologous to the protein vinculin; however, aside from vinculin, αE-catenin has no homology to established actin-binding proteins. The N-terminus of αE-catenin binds β-catenin or γ-catenin/plakoglobin, and the C-terminus binds actin directly or indirectly via vinculin or α-actinin.

Function 
Though αE-catenin exhibits substantial expression in cardiac muscle, αE-catenin is most well known for role in metastasizing tumor cells. αE-catenin also plays a role in epithelial tissue, both at adherens junctions and in signaling pathways.

In cardiomyocytes, αE-catenin is present in cell to cell regions known as adherens junctions which lie within intercalated discs; these junctions anchor the actin cytoskeleton to the sarcolemma and provide strong cell adhesion.

Functional αE-catenin is required for normal embryonic development, as a mutation eliminating the C-terminal 1/3 of the protein resulting in a complete loss-of-function phenotype showed disruption of the trophoblast epithelium and arrested development at the blastocyst stage.

αE-catenin specifically, not β- or γ-catenin, binds F-actin and organizes and tethers the filaments at regions of cell-cell contact. Studies show that full-length αE-catenin binds and bundles F-actin in a superior fashion relative to individual N-terminal or C-terminal domains.

αE-catenin, along with β-catenin and plakoglobin form distinct complexes with N-cadherin that are involved in forming cell-cell contacts and differentiation of cardiomyocytes. Catenin-N-cadherin complexes are apparently necessary for and precede the first cell to cell contact, precursory to gap junction formation. The anchorage of cadherin-catenin complexes to actin filaments by αE-catenin is regulated by tyrosine phosphorylation.

Functional insights into αE-catenin function have come from studies employing transgenesis. Mice harboring a cardiac-specific deletion of αE-catenin exhibited abnormalities in cardiac dimensions and function, representative of dilated cardiomyopathy. This was further characterized by disorganization of intercalated disc structures and mitochondria, as well as compensatory increases in β-catenin and decreases in localization of cadherin and vinculin at intercalated discs. Knockout mice also exhibited high susceptibility to death following stress.

Clinical significance

Interactions 

αE-catenin has been shown to interact with:

 APC,
 Beta-catenin, 
 CDH1, 
 CDH2, 
 CDH3 
 Plakoglobin,  and
 VE-cadherin.

See also 
 Alpha catenin

References

Further reading